John Filip Valter Johansson (21 January 1902 – 1 November 1976) was a Swedish footballer who played as a striker. He was born in Surte, north of Gothenburg. He was nicknamed Svarte-Filip, meaning Black-Filip, referring to the pitch-black colour of his hair. He also played bandy in Surte IS.

After starting his career playing for a local club, he also played for Fässbergs IF and Trollhättans IF before joining IFK Göteborg in 1924. He debuted in Allsvenskan the same year and set a record that season, scoring 39 goals in 21 matches. During his nine seasons in the club, he played 277 matches and scored  333 goals. He never won the Swedish Championships with the club, finishing second three times and third four times. He also played 16 matches for the Swedish national football team, scoring 14 goals.

Johansson died in 1976. In northeast Gothenburg there is a street named after him, "Svarte Filips Gata".

Clubs 

 Surte IS, Fässbergs IF, Trollhättans IF (–1924)
 IFK Göteborg (1924–32)
 Gårda BK (1932–?)

Sources 
 The article is based upon the Swedish version, which in turn is based upon the  article about the player on Gårda BK:s website. .

1902 births
1976 deaths
Swedish footballers
Sweden international footballers
IFK Göteborg players
Allsvenskan players
Association football forwards